Obscurior clarus is a moth of the family Erebidae first described by Michael Fibiger in 2010. It is known from West Sumatra in Indonesia.

The wingspan is about 9.5 mm. The head, patagia, anterior part of the tegulae, prothorax, basal part of the costa and costal part of the medial area are blackish brown. The costal medial-area is quadrangular. The forewing ground colour is light brown and the fringes grey. The crosslines are all indistinct. The terminal line is well marked by black interneural dots. The hindwing is grey, without a discal spot. The underside of the forewing is brown, while the underside of the hindwing is grey, with a discal spot.

References

Micronoctuini
Taxa named by Michael Fibiger
Moths described in 2010